

Public General Acts

|-
| {{|Stamp Duty Land Tax (Temporary Relief) Act 2023|public|2|08-02-2023|maintained=y|archived=n|An Act to reduce, for a temporary period, the amount of stamp duty land tax chargeable on the acquisition of residential property.}}
|-
| {{|Northern Ireland Budget Act 2023|public|3|08-02-2023|maintained=y|archived=n|An Act to authorise the use for the public service of certain resources for the years ending 31 March 2023 and 2024 (including, for the year ending 31 March 2023, income); to authorise the issue out of the Consolidated Fund of Northern Ireland of certain sums for the service of those years; to authorise the use of those sums for specified purposes; to authorise the Department of Finance in Northern Ireland to borrow on the credit of those sums; and to repeal provisions superseded by this Act.}}
|-
| {{|Northern Ireland (Executive Formation and Organ and Tissue Donation) Act 2023|public|4|28-02-2023|maintained=y|archived=n|An Act to make provision to extend the period following the Northern Ireland Assembly election of 5 May 2022 during which Ministers may be appointed and after which the Secretary of State must propose a date for another election; to allow the Secretary of State to propose a date for another election before Ministers have been appointed; and to amend the procedure for making regulations defining permitted material for transplantation in Northern Ireland under section 3 of the Human Tissue Act 2004 in the period until the Presiding Officer and deputies of the Assembly are elected.}}
}}

References

2023